Chris Yan (born 9 December 1988 in Xi’an, China) is an Australian table tennis player. He competed at the 2016 Summer Olympics in the men's singles event, in which he was eliminated in the preliminary round by Aleksandar Karakašević, and as part of the Australian team in the men's team event.

Yan qualified to represent Australia at the 2020 Summer Olympics. He was beaten by Ovidiu Ionescu of Romania in the first round 4-1 and therefore did not advance any further in the singles. He competed in the team event  and the team of Hu Heming, David Powell and Yan advanced to the round of 16 where they were beaten by Japan 3-0. Australia at the 2020 Summer Olympics details the results in depth.

References

External links
Australian Olympic Committee profile

1988 births
Living people
Australian male table tennis players
Olympic table tennis players of Australia
Table tennis players at the 2016 Summer Olympics
Naturalised table tennis players
Table tennis players from Shaanxi
Sportspeople from Xi'an
Table tennis players at the 2018 Commonwealth Games
Commonwealth Games competitors for Australia
Table tennis players at the 2020 Summer Olympics

Naturalised citizens of Australia
Chinese emigrants to Australia